Geoffrey Boot (born 1953) is an English-born politician who until 2021 served as a Member of the House of Keys for Glenfaba and Peel. Before moving to the Isle of Man, Boot also served as a Conservative Councillor and Mayor for Sandgate in Kent.

Early life 
Geoffrey George Boot was born in Nottingham in 1953 and was educated in Sussex Coast College Hastings. Boot's time at college was cut short by a serious motorsport accident which left him hospitalised and forced him to leave further education.

After the accident, Boot began his working career at Midland Bank before moving into surveying and estate agency work. Boot also operated a large soft fruit farm as well as holiday, golf and leisure facilities.

UK political career 
Prior to his election into the House of Keys, Boot was a Conservative Party councillor in the parish of Sandgate, Kent, where he served four years as chairman and for three months was their only mayor. He and his wife Suzie unsuccessfully stood in the 2007 Shepway District Council election for the Folkestone Cheriton ward.

Manx political career 
He contested the House of Keys seat of Glenfaba in both the 2006 and 2011 Manx general elections, but the seat was retained by his opponent David Anderson in both elections. From 2012 to 2015 Boot served as a Commissioner for the parish of German.

He stood in a 2015 by-election triggered by Anderson's promotion to the Legislative Council of the Isle of Man. and won the election with 424 votes. His victory by three votes was described by the Mansfield and Ashfield Chad as "the closest Manx election result since 1929". In Tynwald, Boot sat on the Social Affairs Policy Review Committee, Select Committee of Tynwald on the Registration of Property and served as political member of the Department of Economic Development and the Department of Environment, Food and Agriculture.

In the 2016 Manx General Election, the constituency of Glenfaba was merged with the neighbouring constituency of Peel. Boot was returned with an increased vote count along with former Peel MHK Ray Harmer, who topped the poll. In October 2016 he was chosen by Howard Quayle to serve as Minister for Environment, Food and Agriculture.

From 2017 to 2018, Boot sat on the Select Committee on the Functioning of Tynwald.

As Minister, Boot held responsibility for legislation and regulation relating to the island's farming and fishing industries as well as environmental and biodiversity policy and the protection and management of the island's national glens, territorial seas and reserves. In 2020 Boot was responsible for taking the Climate Change Act through Tynwald, which set out the Isle of Man Government's approach to mitigating the effects of climate change and its commitment to reducing net carbon emissions to zero by 2050.

In May 2021, Boot stated that he intended to stand as a candidate in the 2021 Manx General Election.

But in June 2021, Boot shouted at women (will campaigning for election) from Ireland telling her to go back to Ireland which spark out rage in the community.

Boot stood for re-election for Glenfaba and Peel at the 2021 general election, but was not elected: he came in sixth place with less than 4% of the votes cast.

United Kingdom electoral results

Local elections in the United Kingdom

Electoral results

2006

2011

2015

2016

2021
{| class="wikitable" style="margin-right:1em; font-size:95%;"
|+ style="background-color:#f2f2f2; margin-bottom:-1px; border:1px solid #aaa; padding:0.2em 0.4em;" | Glenfaba & Peel 
! scope="col" rowspan="2" colspan="2" style="width:15em;" | Party
! scope="col" rowspan="2" style="width:17em;" | Candidate
! scope="col" colspan="2"                     | Votes
|-
! scope="col"             style="width:4em;"  | Count
! scope="col"             style="width:6em;"  | Of total (%)

Personal life 
Boot has four children with his wife Suzie. Mr and Mrs Boot own a number of properties including Sandgate Castle, a Device Fort in Sandgate, Kent. which is now used by his property investment company, AMT South Eastern Ltd.

He is a commercial pilot and a chief flying instructor. He won the King's Cup Race three times and was a co-founder of FLYER magazine. In 2016, Boot announced that he would be downsizing his commitments.

On the 18 March 1999 he was enrolled as a minor Scottish baron, with the title of Baron Boot of Waughton. Boot is related to the family associated with the Boots pharmaceutical chain.

Notes

References

 Airprox in UK airspace involving General Aviation accidents Book No 15 (editor and member of Airprox Board).
 Royal Aero Club Newsletter winter 2005/06.

External links
Geoffrey Boot's website

British air racers
Living people
Manx sportsmen
People from Sandgate, Kent
Mayors of places in Kent
Conservative Party (UK) councillors
Members of the House of Keys 2011–2016
Members of the House of Keys 2016–2021
1953 births